Skogsaktuellt (meaning Forest News in English) is a Swedish agriculture and forestry magazine published in Örebro, Sweden.  The magazine was first published in May 2007.

Skogsaktuellt is published on a monthly basis. It is the sister publication of Jordbruksaktuellt and Entreprenadaktuellt which are all part of Agriprim AB.

References

External links
Official website

2007 establishments in Sweden
Agricultural magazines
Magazines established in 2007
Magazines published in Sweden
Monthly magazines published in Sweden
Swedish-language magazines
Mass media in Örebro